Hasta la vista may refer to:

Music
"Hasta la Vista" (MC Solaar song), 2001
"Hasta la vista" (Oleksandr Ponomaryov song), 2003
"Hasta la vista" (Ruslan Alekhno song), 2008
"Hasta la vista" (Hurricane song), Serbian entry in the Eurovision Song Contest 2020
"Hasta la Vista", a song from the Camp Rock soundtrack
 Hasta La Vista (Lil Wayne song), 2018

Others
Come as You Are (2011 film), also known as Hasta la Vista, a film by Geoffrey Enthoven
Hasta La Vista (novel), a 1958 Albanian novel by Petro Marko

See also
Hasta la vista, baby (disambiguation)